Robert Piguet (1898 – 1953) was a Swiss-born, Paris-based fashion designer who is mainly remembered for training Christian Dior and Hubert de Givenchy.  The Piguet fashion house ran from 1933 to 1951; since then, the brand Robert Piguet has been associated exclusively with fragrances.

Early life and education
Piguet was born in Yverdon-les-Bains in Switzerland, in 1898, according to the Swiss Fashion Museum, the Musée suisse de la Mode, which holds his archives, although many other sources give an alternative birth year of 1901. In Paris Couturiers and Milliners, published in 1949, Piguet is said to have been 17 in 1918.

Death
Piguet died at Lausanne, Switzerland, on 22 February 1953.

Career
The young Piguet originally trained to be a banker, like his father, but preferred fashion design, much to his father's disapproval. In late 1918, just after the end of World War I, he decided to go to Paris to pursue his vocation.

Initially, Piguet began working with Paul Poiret, before being poached by the Paris branch of Redfern. In 1932, an American author writing on Paris fashion commented that the American cartoonist 'would probably select Robert Piguet, the designer at Redfern's, as the ideal Parisian dressmaker.'

In 1933, Piguet launched his own fashion house. Eleanor Lambert described him as known for '"thin suits" and tasteful day dresses,' whilst Vogue declared him the 'master of the little wool dress'.  He is perhaps best known for giving Christian Dior his big break in 1937, allowing him to design for three collections. Dior later said: 'Robert Piguet taught me the virtues of simplicity through which true elegance must come.' One of Dior's designs for Piguet, a day dress called 'Cafe Anglais' with a short and full skirt was particularly well received. While at Piguet, Dior worked alongside Pierre Balmain, and was succeeded by Marc Bohan as house designer. In addition to Dior, Bohan and Balmain, other designers who had an early start with Piguet included James Galanos and Hubert de Givenchy.

Piguet's archive, consisting of 3,000 original designs, photographs and documents, is held by the Musée suisse de la Mode, in his birthplace, Yverdon-les-Bains.

Perfumes
In collaboration with Germaine Cellier, Robert Piguet launched his first perfume Bandit (created 1942) in the USA in 1944, with a dramatic presentation featuring models with guns and knives, one of whom is said to have smashed a bottle of the fragrance on the floor. His most successful fragrance was Fracas (1948), also co-developed with Cellier - an updated version of which was inducted into the FiFi Awards's Hall of Fame in 2006. Other fragrances developed under Piguet's supervision were Visa (1945) and Baghari (1950). Following Piguet's death, fragrances such as Cravache (1963) and Futur (1960s) continued to be developed under his name, although 'Robert Piguet' gradually fell from public awareness until being bought by the American company Fashion Fragrances & Cosmetics Ltd in 1993.

References

Online links
 - Official site for the current company

1898 births
1953 deaths
French fashion designers
Swiss fashion designers
Perfume houses
Swiss emigrants to France
People from Yverdon-les-Bains